Sara Waisglass  is a Canadian actress having arose to notability as a child actress, playing the role of Jordy Cooper in the children’s sitcom Overruled! from 2010 to 2011, as Frankie Hollingsworth in Degrassi: The Next Generation and Degrassi: Next Class from 2013 to 2017. As an adult, she starred as Robyn in the 2017 film Mary Goes Round and as Maxine in the Netflix drama series Ginny & Georgia in 2021 and 2022.

Early life  
Sara was born on July 3, 1998, and raised in Toronto, Ontario, by her parents Tessa and Jeff Waisglass, along with her sister Carly. She attended Earl Haig Secondary School in Toronto. She attended York University for four years, graduating with a degree in screenwriting, writing being a path she wants to develop as her career progresses. She also likes to play the piano.

Career 
In 2007, Waisglass made her way into the entertainment industry as a child actress, making her television debut playing 8 year old Jane in The Jane Show. In 2008, Waisglass made her big screen debut in the Gilles Bourdos directed psychological thriller Afterwards alongside John Malkovich and Evangeline Lilly. In 2009, she continued as a child actress in 29 episodes of Overruled!. She once appeared in a commercial for KFC.

In 2015, Waisglass appeared in the Anton Corbijn directed biographical drama film Life, amongst a cast that included Robert Pattinson and Sir Ben Kingsley. The same year, Waisglass was nominated for Best Recurring Young Actress 16-21 at the Young Entertainer Awards 2015 for her main role performance of Frankie Hollingsworth in Degrassi: The Next Generation.

In 2017, Waisglass played Mary’s half-sister Robyn in the Molly McGlynn directed film Mary Goes Round, which featured at the 2017 Toronto International Film Festival. In 2020, she starred as Madison St. Claire
in 8 episodes of the supernatural drama series October Faction.

In 2021, Waisglass starred as Maxine, best friend of Ginny and part of the MANG group (Max, Abby, Norah and Ginny) in the Netflix comedy series Ginny and Georgia, in a cast that included Brianne Howey, Antonia Gentry, Chelsea Clark and Katie Douglas.

Filmography

Film

Television

Awards and nominations

References

External links 
 
 
20 questions with Sara Waisglass

21st-century Canadian actresses
Actresses from Toronto
Canadian television actresses
Canadian film actresses
Living people
1998 births